David Montero may refer to:
 David Montero (footballer, born 1974)
David Montero (footballer, born 1985)